Chia is a surname. It is a Latin-alphabet spelling of various Chinese surnames, as well as an Italian surname.

Statistics
Chia was the 20th-most common Chinese surname in Singapore as of 1997 (ranked by English spelling, rather than by Chinese characters). Roughly 22,600 people, or 0.9% of the Chinese Singaporean population at the time, bore the surname Chia. Among respondents to the 2000 United States Census, Chia was the 856th-most common surname among Asian Pacific Americans, and 17,530th-most common overall, with 1,481 bearers (72.78% of whom identified as Asian/Pacific Islander). In Italy, 72 families bore the surname Chia, with more than half located in Sardinia.

Origins
Chia may be a spelling of a number of Chinese surnames, based on different varieties of Chinese, listed below by their romanisation in Mandarin pinyin:

 Jia (various characters and tones), all spelled Chia in the Wade–Giles romanisation of Mandarin used before the development of pinyin, and still widespread in Taiwan.
 Jiā (IPA: /t͡ɕia⁵⁵/)
 Jiá (IPA: /t͡ɕia³⁵/), which originated as a toponymic surname.
 Jiǎ (IPA: /t͡ɕia²¹⁴/), which originated as a shortening of an ancient toponymic surname Jiǎfù.
 Xiè, spelled Chia based on its pronunciation in various Southern Min dialects, including:
Hokkien (Pe̍h-ōe-jī: Chiā; IPA: /t͡ɕia³³/)
Teochew (Peng'im: Zia7; IPA: /t͡sia¹¹/)
 Chē, spelled Chia based on its pronunciation in various Southern Min dialects, including:
Hokkien (POJ: Chhia, IPA: /t͡ɕʰia⁴⁴/)
Teochew (Peng'im: Cia1; IPA: /t͡sʰia³³/)

It is also an Italian toponymic surname referring to Chia, Province of South Sardinia. That toponym may have originated from a Phoenician word for "valley".

Chinese surname 谢

Chia Boon Leong (1925–2022), Singaporean footballer
Eric Chia (1930s–2008), Malaysian businessman
Nicholas Chia (born 1938), third Roman Catholic Archbishop of Singapore
Chia Thye Poh (born 1941), Singaporean political activist imprisoned for 23 years without charge or trial
Mantak Chia (born 1944), Thai Taoist master
Yvonne Chia (born ), Malaysian banker
Chia Yong Yong (born 1962), Singaporean lawyer and politician
Steve Chia (born 1970), Singaporean politician
Danny Chia (born 1972), Malaysian golfer
Michelle Chia (born 1975), Singaporean actress
Elvin Chia (born 1977), Malaysian swimmer
Amber Chia (born 1981), Malaysian model and actress
Wen Shin Chia (born ), Malaysian environmentalist
Kimberly Chia (born 1995), Singaporean actress
Aaron Chia (born 1997), Malaysian badminton player
Nelson Chia, Singaporean television actor and director

Chinese surname 賈

Chia Ching-teh (1880–1960), Republic of China politician
Chia Lien-chen (1912–?), Chinese middle-distance runner
Pei-yuan Chia (born 1939), Hong Kong-born American banker
Alyssa Chia (born 1974), Taiwanese actress
Chih-Ta Chia, Taiwanese physicist
Wenlan Chia, Taipei-born American fashion designer

Other or unknown
People with a non-Chinese surname Chia, or whose names as written in Chinese characters are not available:
Chia Chungchang, Chinese basketball player
Víctor Li-Carrillo Chía (1929–1988), Peruvian philosopher
Cheng Sait Chia (1940–1981), Singaporean-born Canadian poet
Sandro Chia (born 1946), Italian painter and sculptor
Beatrice Chia (born 1974), Singaporean actress
Gec Chia (born 1979), Filipino businessman and former basketball player
Daphne Chia (born 1996), Singaporean gymnast
Luis Carlos Chía (born 1997), Colombian cyclist
Grace Chia, Singaporean writer

See also

Chica (name)
Chika (general name)

References

Chinese-language surnames
Italian-language surnames
Multiple Chinese surnames